Graffam may refer to:
 Mary Louise Graffam (1871–1921), American teacher and witness to the Armenian genocide
 Graffam Development Historic District, a residential area in Brookline, Massachusetts, United States

See also 
 Graffham, a village in Sussex, England
 Grafham (disambiguation)